Kavita Lad-Medhekar is an Indian actress, known for her work in Marathi Theatre, Television and Films. She is best known for her daily soap opera roles in Char Divas Sasuche, Unch Majha Zoka, Radha Hi Bawari, Radha Prem Rangi Rangali, Tula Shikvin Changalach Dhada and also for her theatre performances in Sundar Mi Honar, Eka Lagnachi Goshta, Char Divas Premache and Eka Lagnachi Pudhchi Goshta.

Personal life
Lad was born in Thane, Maharashtra. 
She completed her education from Thana college.
Kavita married Ashish Medhekar in 2003.

Career
Kavita Lad first made her first appearance onscreen in N. Chandras Marathi film Ghayaal opposite Ajinkya Deo. She later appeared in films like Jigar opposite Laxmikant Berde, Tu Tithe Mee with Prashant Damle which won the National Award , Lapun Chapun , Anolkhi Hey Ghar Maze, Sukhant, Urfi, Asehi Ekada Vhave.

Lad made her Marathi theatre debut with Sundar Mi Honar starring Dr. Sriram Lagoo and Vandana Gupte. Her paring with Prashant Damle in plays like Char Divas Premache, Eka Lagnachi Goshta, Mazhiya Bhaujinna Reet Kalena and recently released 2018 sequel Eka Lagnachi Pudhchi Goshta has been praised by audience and is the only evergreen hit duo in the Marathi theatre industry with maximum hit plays . 

Been working in the Marathi Television industry for two decades, her notable work includes Char Divas Sasuche with Rohini Hattangadi, Kay Pahilas Mazyat, Dar Uagada Na Gade, Unch Maaza Zoka, Radha Hi Bawari, Tumcha Amcha Same Asta, Tuzya Vachun Karmena, Radha Prem Rangi Rangali etc. 

She made her Hindi Television debut in Chandrakant Chiplunkar Seedi Bambawala with Prashant Damle in 2014.

As of 2019, Lad will be seen in Love You Zindagi, a comedy drama film opposite Sachin Pilgaonkar and coming of age comedy film titled 'Girlfriend' with Amey Wagh, Sai Tamhankar.

She also starred in Anant Mahadevan directorial Doctor Rakhmabai  as Jayantibai with Prasad Oak and Tannishtha Chatterjee.

Filmography

Films

Theatre

Television

References

External links 

Images at The Times of India
Images at marathiactors.com 
Article about Kavita Lad in Maharashtra Times

Living people
Marathi people
Actresses in Marathi cinema
Actresses in Marathi theatre
1973 births